René Marić (born 4 September 1992) is an Austrian football coach. He recently served as the assistant head coach at Premier League side Leeds United.

Career

Early career 
Marić started his coaching career at his local side TSU Handenberg, at the age of 17. Alongside coaching, Marić studied Psychology at University. He also wrote for the website Spielverlagerung, which helped open up doors for consultancy and coaching roles within football.

RB Salzburg 
Marić struck up a friendship with Salzburg’s under-18 coach, Marco Rose, and was subsequently appointed his assistant in 2016.  Marić was promoted to the assistant of the first team, in the summer of 2017, with Rose succeeding Oscar Garcia as head coach of RB Salzburg.

Borussia Mönchengladbach 
In 2019, René Marić joined Borussia Mönchengladbach, as Assistant Manager to Marco Rose.

Borussia Dortmund 
At the end of the 2020-21 Bundesliga season Marić left Mönchengladbach along with Rose and Zickler to join Borussia Dortmund as Assistant Manager. However at the end of the season Dortmund decided to part company with Rose along with Maric, Alexander Zickler and Patrick Eibenberger.

Leeds United 
On 30th July 2022, Marić was appointed as the Assistant Head Coach, to Jesse Marsch, at Leeds United. He departed Leeds United on 6 February 2023, following the sacking of Jesse Marsch.

Personal life 
Marić is of Croatian descent. He initially sought to play professional football but was forced to switch to coaching due to lack of playing opportunities. Marić, along with several other football enthusiasts, started an online blog called Spielverlagerung where he would rate and analyse performances of Bundesliga teams. An assistant of Thomas Tuchel's at Mainz 05, who had been following Marić's blog analysis of the team's performances, came in contact with Marić and invited him to Mainz for cooperation.

Honours

Assistant manager
Red Bull Salzburg 
Austrian Bundesliga: 2017–18, 2018–19
Austrian Cup: 2018–19

Red Bull Salzburg – Youth
UEFA Youth League: 2016–17

References

External links

  
 

1992 births
Living people
Borussia Mönchengladbach non-playing staff
Borussia Dortmund non-playing staff
Austrian expatriate sportspeople in Germany
Austrian football managers
Austrian people of Croatian descent
Leeds United F.C. non-playing staff